Cat 3 or CAT3 may refer to:

 Category 3 cable, an unshielded twisted pair cable
 Nanaimo/Long Lake Water Airport (ICAO airport code), Canada
 Cognitive Abilities Test 3, a test of reasoning abilities undertaken by students in the UK and Canada
 CAT III, an instrument landing system category
 CAT III, a measurement category used to classify live electric circuits
  LTE User Equipment Category 3